Uppu Huli Khara is a 2017 Indian Kannada comedy drama film written and directed by Imran Sardhariya, produced by M. Ramesh under the banner Tejeshwini Enterprises. The film stars Shashi Devraj, Malashri, Sharath, Anushree, B. Dhananjay, Jayashree and Shamanth Shetty in prominent roles.

This film marks second directorial venture of Imran Sardhariya. Music was composed by Juda Sandy, Prajwal Pai and Kishore Eksa and art direction by Shivkumar for the film. Stunt sequence choreographed by Ravi Varma. The principal photography commenced on 18 April 2016 and will be released in 2017.

Plot
The story revolves around a bank robbery and the hunt to find the culprits. Story takes comical twists and turns when the investigating officer is left on wild goose chase. The plot thickens when the investigating officer gets an anonymous call from a girl. The girl reveals the identity and details of three boys who have committed the crime. The investigating officer arrests three youth under suspicion. The Young boys being Vijay Suriya a medical aspirant, Sharath a police aspirant and Dhananjay a Fast-food supplier. The investigating officer faces pressure as this case creates huge momentum on digital media, news rooms and dailies, huge debates and Speculations breaks out. The media attention catches the eyes of the local MLA and other politician who in turn starting interfering in the investigation. Will the investigating officer get to the bottom of the crime, are the boys the real criminals and what happens to the stolen assets of the bank.

Cast
 Shashi Devraj
 Malashri
 Sharath
 Anushree
 B. Dhananjay
 Jayashree
 Shamanth Shetty as Bukki

Production
After the success of the romantic thriller film Endendigu (2015), writer-director Imran Sardhariya announced his next project. On 17 April 2016 Chairperson of Infosys Foundation, Sudha Murthy sounded the clap for Uppu Huli Khara.

Soundtrack

References

External links 
 
 

2017 films
2010s Kannada-language films
Indian comedy thriller films
Indian heist films
2017 masala films